Melville Harold "Mel" Bungey (born 30 August 1934) is an Australian retired politician. Born in Gnowangerup, Western Australia, he was educated at Wesley College, Perth and the University of Western Australia before becoming a farmer. Later, he was Vice-President of the Wool Section in the Farmers' Union of Western Australia. In 1974, he was elected to the Australian House of Representatives as the Liberal member for Canning, defeating the sitting member, John Hallett of the Country Party. He held the seat until his defeat in 1983 by Labor candidate Wendy Fatin.

References

Liberal Party of Australia members of the Parliament of Australia
Members of the Australian House of Representatives for Canning
Members of the Australian House of Representatives
1934 births
Living people
People educated at Wesley College, Perth
20th-century Australian politicians
People from Gnowangerup, Western Australia
University of Western Australia alumni